Dmitri Samorukov (born 16 June 1999) is a Russian professional ice hockey player currently playing for the Springfield Thunderbirds in the American Hockey League (AHL) as a prospect to the St. Louis Blues of the National Hockey League (NHL).

Playing career
Samorukov played major junior hockey in the Ontario Hockey League with the Guelph Storm and was drafted by the Oilers in the 2017 NHL Entry Draft in the third round, 84th overall. He signed an entry level contract on 7 September 2017. In the 2020–21 season, he played one season in the Kontinental Hockey League (KHL) with CSKA Moscow due to COVID-19-related stoppages in North American hockey, but returned to Bakersfield for the next season.

On 9 October 2022, Samorukov was traded by the Oilers to the St. Louis Blues in exchange for fellow Russian, Klim Kostin.

Career statistics

Regular season and playoffs

International

References

External links

1999 births
Living people
Bakersfield Condors players
HC CSKA Moscow players
Edmonton Oilers draft picks
Edmonton Oilers players
Guelph Storm players
Russian ice hockey defencemen
Springfield Thunderbirds players
Sportspeople from Volgograd